Arax Mansourian (Armenian; Արաքս Մանսուրյան, born August 1, 1946) is an Armenian soprano classical singer. Mansourian serves as Professor at the Yerevan Komitas State Conservatory since 2015. In 2015 she was awarded with the First Degree Medal of Armenia. In 2010 Mansourian was Awarded with the Medal of Komitas by the Ministry Of the Diaspora.

Biography
Arax Mansourian was born in Beirut, Lebanon. Her family moved to Armenia when Arax was still an infant. Growing up in Armenia. She studied at the Romanos Meliqyan college of music and later graduated from the Yerevan State Komitas Conservatory, where she was the only performer of modern classical atonal music. During her studies she participated in festivals throughout Russia and The Soviet Union. After graduation, she soon started to sing at the Yerevan State Opera.  
 
After moving to Australia in the mid-1990s, she started her work with Opera Australia (OA). Her first role with OA was of Liu in Puccini's Turandot Liu was followed by Santuzza in Mascagni's Cavalleria Rusticana in Melbourne (OA) "Armenian Arax Mansourian is a natural Santuzza with real power...", Sydney Opera House (OA) and Brisbane for Opera Queensland. Then came Tosca in Puccini's Tosca (Opera Queensland), Desdemona in Verdi's Othello (OA), Elisabeth de Valois in Verdi's Don Carlos, Fata Morgana in Prokofiev's Love for Three Oranges (OA Sydney) Katya in Janacek's Katya Kabanova (OA Sydney)
 
Mansourian lives with her husband, Jacob Kiujian, in Sydney, Australia. She has two daughters. She teaches and gives vocal masterclasses. Since 2012 Mansourian has worked with the Donate Life children's charity in Armenia, organizing concerts with the proceeds going to the organization.

References

Other sources
 
 
 
 
 
 
 
 
 
 

20th-century Armenian women opera singers
20th-century Australian women opera singers
1946 births
Living people
Musicians from Beirut
Lebanese people of Armenian descent